Beach water polo competition at the 2014 Asian Beach Games was held in Phuket, Thailand from 18 to 22 November 2014 at Karon Beach, Phuket. Kazakhstan won the gold medal in a round robin competition, Iran won the silver medal and Kuwait finished third.

Medalists

Results

References

External links 
 Official website
Summary

2014 Asian Beach Games events
Asian Beach Games
2014